The Pejepscot Paper Company mill building is a historic paper mill located off U.S. 201 in Topsham, Maine, on the banks of the Androscoggin River, adjacent from Brunswick Falls and the Frank J. Wood Bridge. Built in 1868, the building is one of the oldest surviving paper mills in the state of Maine. The mill was added to the National Register of Historic Places on September 17, 1974, and is now a mixed-use commercial property, housing the Sea Dog Brewing Company.

Design

The Pejepscot Paper Company mill building is a historic paper mill that stands on a point projecting southward into the Androscoggin River, just east of the Frank J. Wood Bridge carrying U.S. Route 201 between Topsham and Brunswick, Maine. It is a large three storey brick building, with a gambrel roof and a granite foundation. The short end facing the river is eight bays wide, each bay consisting of a recessed panel housing windows set in segmental arch openings and topped by decorative arches. Near the center of the building, a five-story square tower rises to a shallow-pitch pyramidal roof.

History

Currently it is used as office and retail space.

The mill was built in the year  and is an instance of Maine's 19th century wood pulp mills. It was under the management of Sanford A. Perkins for the Topsham Paper Company, and Samuel R. Jackson was the president of the corporation.

The Topsham Paper Company utilized grinders from the machine shop of the Bath Iron Works and grew  rapidly from when they started out in the basement of a sawmill run by Charles D. Brown and E. B. Dentstm. The success of this early venture caused Brown and Denison to branch out with other mills. Overexpansion and trouble with investors culminated in the company going out of business.

The following year, February 19, 1875, W.H.&A.W. Parsons was incorporated into the Bowdoin Paper Manufacturing Company, with a capital not to exceed . The mill contained, at that time, one Fourdrinier machine, four roll engines, one patent Jordan engine, one rotary, and two tub bleachers.

In  the Pejepscot Paper Company bought the mill and doubled the equipment. The mill then contained two Fourdrinier machines, nine roll engines, two patent engines, two rotary and two tub bleachers. by  the company was producing  of paper daily. The company fitted a machine shop, with wood and iron working machinery necessary for the mill repairs, and for the manufacture of any new machinery needed in the business. They employed forty-five males and thirty females, manufacturing book and wood newspaper.

By , when the company closed its doors, they had only 13 employees. By this time the building was used as a paper finishing facility where paper rolls were converted into sheets for construction paper, art paper and paper for business forms.

From  to  the Hearst Company used the mill to store paper, but from 1986 until 1998 the building was vacant. In 1998 the Fore River Company out of Portland, Maine bought the building, renovated it for office space, and leased the old mill to the Sea Dog Brewing Company, who in turn, added a patio overlooking the Androscoggin River.

On September 17, 1974, the Pejepscot Paper Company was listed in the National Register of Historic Places.

See also
 National Register of Historic Places listings in Sagadahoc County, Maine

References

Italianate architecture in Maine
Industrial buildings completed in 1868
Buildings and structures in Topsham, Maine
Industrial buildings and structures on the National Register of Historic Places in Maine
National Register of Historic Places in Sagadahoc County, Maine
Pulp and paper mills in the United States
1868 establishments in Maine
Pulp and paper industry in Maine
Pejepscot, Maine